Hot Snow is a 1972 Soviet war film, directed by Gabriel Yegiazarov.

Plot
In December 1942, during the Second World War, the soldiers of a Red Army anti-tank gun battery face the onslaught of General von Manstein's armored divisions trying to relieve the besieged 6th Army in Stalingrad. Eventually only seven of them survive, but the German tank breakthrough is stopped, and in the final episode General Lieutenant Bessonov (Georgiy Zhzhonov) awards each of the survivors with the Order of Red Banner saying: "Thank you for tanks knocked out. That's all I can do...".

Production
The film is an adaptation of Yuri Bondarev's eponymous 1969 novel, which was itself based on Bondarev's own wartime experience as a battery commander in Stalingrad.

Reception
Hot Snow was viewed by 22.9 million people, but failed to secure any nominations or awards.

Select cast
 Yuri Nazarov as Sergeant Ukhanov 
 Boris Tokarev as Lieutenant Kuznetsov 
 Anatoly Kuznetsov as Vesnin 
 Georgiy Zhzhonov as General Bessonov 
 Vadim Spiridonov as Colonel Deev
 Igor Ledogorov as Osin, Colonel, Chief of Counterintelligence
 Nikolai Yeremenko Jr. as Drozdovsky
 Tamara Sedelnikova as Tanya (as T. Sedelnikova)
 Ara Babadzhanyan as Davlatyan (as A. Babadzhanyan)
 Aleksei Pankin as Chubarikov

References

External links
 
 

1972 films
Russian war drama films
1970s war drama films
Soviet war drama films
1970s Russian-language films
Mosfilm films
Eastern Front of World War II films
1972 drama films
Films about the Battle of Stalingrad
Soviet World War II films
Russian World War II films